Kim Chunsu (November 25, 1922 – November 29, 2004) was one of the leading South Korean poets of the late twentieth century. He won numerous literary awards and was a professor of Korean Literature. His works have been translated into English, German and Spanish.

Life
Kim was born in Chungmu (present-day Tongyeong) on November 25, 1922. He studied literature at Nihon University in Japan from 1940 to 1943, at which time he was expelled and jailed for speaking against the Japanese Empire. After his release seven months later, he returned to Korea and taught in middle and high schools. He began to publish poetry in 1946. He joined the faculty of Kyungpook National University in 1965, and became Dean of the Department of Literature at Yeungnam University in 1978. In 1981, he was elected to the National Assembly. Kim died on November 29, 2004.

Work

He made his debut with the publication of his poem “The Hothouse” in the eighth volume of Bamboo Shoots and release of his collection of poems, Clouds and Roses, the same year. After the introduction of his work in the late forties, however, Kim's career as a poet spanned almost four decades, and his writing evolved and transformed itself with the times. His work can be roughly divided into four periods. The first, which includes his works such as “A Flower” and “An Introductory Poem for a Flower”, focuses on the fundamental role of language and linguistics in attaining consciousness of any particular object's existence. The second period, which encompassed the late 1950s to the late 1960s, was filled with works that used description-oriented narrative images, imagery and aesthetic metaphor purely for imagery's sake. Word play, such as that in “Ballad Tone” (Tareongjo), was also prominent in Kim's works during these years.

The poem “The Heartbreak of Cheoyong” (Cheoyong danjang) signaled the beginning of the third period and a radical break with from his previous work. The poems of this period, rather than centering on the chimerical world of images that were the subject of his previous poetry, emphasized the other worldly, the plane beyond images. His fourth period of poetry, which encompasses his work 1970's until the early 1980s, was marked by Kim's musings and reflections on art and religion, into which he sought insight into their purpose for humanity and their relevance to the earthly life.

Kim won numerous awards including the second Korean Poets’ Association Prize, the seventh Asia Freedom Literature Prize, the Art Academy Prize, and the Culture Medal. In 2007, he was listed by the Korean Poets' Association among the ten most important modern Korean poets.

Works in translation
English
 The Snow Falling on Chagall's Village (김춘수 시선 <샤갈의 마을에 내리는 눈>)
Spanish
 Poemas (김춘수 시선)
 Razón de las sinrazones (김춘수 시선)
German
 Blätter des Indong (김춘수 시선집 <인동초>)
French
 Prélude au poème pour une fleur (김춘수 시선)
Japanese
 韓国三人詩選 (한국 현대 시선)
 鏡の中の天使 (거울 속의 천사)

Works in Korean (partial)
Poetry Collections
 The Swamp (Neup)
 Flag (Gi)
 Sketch of a Flower (Kkochui somyo 
 Death of a Girl in Budapest (Budapeseuteueseoui sonyeoui jugeum)
 Ballad Tone and Others (Tareongjo gita), Cheoyong
 Selected Poems of Kim Chunsu, Namcheon
 A Rain-Soaked Moon
 After Cheoyong
 The Heartbreak of Cheoyong (Cheoyong danjang)
 The Sleep Standing Forest (Seoseo jamdeuneun sup)
Academic Works
 The Morphology of Modern Korean Poetry
 Understanding Poetry
 Meaning and Meaninglessness
 The Countenance of Poetry (Siui Pyojeong)

Awards
 Second Korean Poets’ Association Prize
 Seventh Asia Freedom Literature Prize
 Art Academy Prize
 Culture Medal

Bibliography
Kim Ch'un-Su, 
The Snow Falling on Chagall's Village: Selected Poems. 
Translated from Korean into English by Kim Jong-Gil. Cornell East Asia Series, 93. Ithaca, NY: East Asia Program, Cornell University, 1998.

See also
List of Korean-language poets
Korean poetry
Korean culture
Society of Korean Poets

References

External links
  
  
 Translation of two Kim Chun-su poems
 Essay and additional translations
 Hughes, Theodore, Review of The Snow Falling on Chagall's Village
 Obituary from the Korea Times
 Top Ten Korean Modern Poets Selected from the Korea Times
 Exhibition Hall(Tongyeong city)

1922 births
2004 deaths
Members of the National Assembly (South Korea)
South Korean male poets
People from South Gyeongsang Province
Nihon University alumni
Kyungpook National University alumni
Yeungnam University alumni
20th-century South Korean poets
Society of Korean Poets Award winners
Gwangsan Kim clan
20th-century male writers